Graniteville is a census-designated place (CDP) in the town of Barre, Washington County, Vermont, United States.  The population of the CDP was 784 at the 2010 census. Prior to 2010, it was part of the Graniteville-East Barre CDP, which consisted of three unincorporated villages in the town: Graniteville, East Barre, and Websterville.

Graniteville is home to the Rock of Ages granite company and the E. L. Smith Quarry, the world's largest deep hole granite quarry.

Geography

References

Census-designated places in Vermont
CDP
Census-designated places in Washington County, Vermont